Afef Ben Ismail (born 17 March 1994 in Tunis) is a Tunisian sprint canoeist.

She competed at the 2012 Summer Olympics in London, United Kingdom, in the women's K-1 500 metres where she finished sixth in her semifinal and failed to qualify for the final.

She competed in the women's K-2 500 metres with Khaoula Sassi at the 2020 Summer Olympics.

References

External links 
 

Living people
1994 births
Tunisian female canoeists
Canoeists at the 2012 Summer Olympics
Canoeists at the 2016 Summer Olympics
Olympic canoeists of Tunisia
African Games silver medalists for Tunisia
African Games medalists in canoeing
Competitors at the 2011 All-Africa Games
Competitors at the 2019 African Games
Competitors at the 2013 Mediterranean Games
Mediterranean Games competitors for Tunisia
Canoeists at the 2020 Summer Olympics
21st-century Tunisian women